Nosipho Dumisa (born 1988) is a South African writer, director and producer. She co-founded the production company Gambit Films. She wrote and directed her first feature film, the crime thriller Nommer 37, first as a short in 2014 followed by a feature version in 2018. She created the Netflix series Blood & Water (2020). She previously worked as a producer on the Afrikaans soap opera Suidooster.

Her works have been premiered at South by Southwest and have won international awards. She has sat on the jury of the Neuchâtel International Fantastic Film Festival in Switzerland. Her works typically feature Cape Town, where she resides, as a setting.

Early life 
Dumisa is from Margate, KwaZulu-Natal. She is Zulu, but learned Afrikaans in school. Initially into acting, an administrative error that enrolled her in a filmmaking course instead of an acting one led her to discover her interest in what happens behind the camera. She graduated with a Bachelor of Arts in the Motion Picture Medium from AFDA in 2009.

Filmography

Film

Television

References

External links 

 

1988 births
Living people
People from Ray Nkonyeni Local Municipality
Zulu people
South African film directors
South African screenwriters
21st-century South African women writers
South African television directors
South African women film directors
Women television directors